G-Anime is an annual weekend anime convention held in late January in Gatineau, Quebec, Canada at the Palais des congrès de Gatineau and the Four Points Sheraton Gatineau. The convention is run and organized by La Société d'Animation Japonaise de Gatineau (SAJG) and is one of two anime conventions in the Ottawa-Gatineau Area.

Programming
G-Anime's events, attractions and activities, just like most other anime conventions, include a Dealers Room and an Artists Alley, anime screenings, panels and workshops, AMV contests, game shows, cosplay events (Masquerade, Cosplay Chess, Fashion Show, etc.), and video games stations (Gaming Room).

History
The idea for a new anime convention started when an organization called SOAP announced in summer 2008 that the 4th edition of their convention AC-Cubed was cancelled. In an effort to replace the local convention (AC-Cubed was in Ottawa, which along with Gatineau, are part of the National Capital Region of Canada), G-Anime was created. The convention's first edition was held on February 7–8, 2009.

Starting in 2012, G-Anime was held on 3 days and featured 24-hour programming (overnight at the Four Points Sheraton hotel). Starting in 2015, the convention started holding a multi-day convention in the summer in addition to the winter convention.

Event history

Chibi G-Anime
From 2012 through 2014, the SAJG held a 1-day convention called Chibi G-Anime on a Saturday in July at a hotel in midtown Gatineau. Featuring a reduced programming list and a smaller number of exhibitors, Chibi G-Anime caters to summer convention-goers of the Ottawa-Gatineau Area and beyond during the inter-convention period between Anime North in Toronto and Otakuthon in Montreal, a generally lull period where there are no major fan conventions in either of the 3 cities.

Mascot

Gamine (French for tomboy or a girl with a mischievous, boyish charm.), a play on the convention's name, was chosen as the mascot's name during the first convention by the winner of a cosplay contest where participants had to dress like her. She is recognizable by her reddish hair, her turquoise eyes and her purple clothing.

Notes

 The Gatineau Japanese Animation Society.
 Society for Ottawa's Anime Promotion.
 AC3, or ACCC, the Anime Convention in the Capital of Canada.

References

External links
 http://www.ganime.ca/ G-Anime official website
 G-Anime on Facebook
 G-Anime on Twitter
 G-Anime on deviantART

Anime conventions in Canada
Festivals in Gatineau
Arts festivals in Quebec